Pavel Izbisciuc (born 10 July 1995) is a Moldovan butterfly swimmer. He competed in the men's 50 metre butterfly event at the 2017 World Aquatics Championships.

References

External links
 

1995 births
Living people
Moldovan male butterfly swimmers
Place of birth missing (living people)